Schild is a German surname meaning "shield". Notable people with the surname include:

Alfred Schild (1921–1977), American physicist
André Schild (1910–1981), Swiss linguist
Bernadette Schild (born 1990), Austrian alpine skier
Charles Schild (1902–1980), American inventor
Christina Schild, Austrian-Canadian actress
Edi Schild (born 1919), Swiss cross-country skier
Erwin Schild (born 1920), German-Canadian Conservative rabbi and author
Irving Schild, American commercial photographer
Jerry Schild, former NASCAR Cup Series driver
Marlies Schild (born 1981), Austrian alpine skier
Martina Schild (born 1981), Swiss alpine skier
 Ozer Schild (1930-2006), Danish-born Israeli academic, President of the University of Haifa and President of the College of Judea and Samaria ("Ariel College").
Rolf Schild (1924–2003), German-born British businessman
Romuald Schild (1936–2021), Polish archaeologist
Rudolph Schild, American astrophysicist
Thekla Schild (1890–1991), German architect

See also
Schild's ladder, in the theory of general relativity, and differential geometry more generally
Schild regression
Schild's Ladder, 2002 science fiction novel
Schildt

German-language surnames